The Sensorium is regarded the world's first commercial 4D film and was first screened in a Six Flags theme park in Baltimore in 1984. It was produced in partnership with Landmark Entertainment.

Description
The 4D film included multiple track discrete sound system, bodysonic seats and Scent-a-Vision (a series of smells released in sync with the film). The story told a series of American pastimes around the turn of the twentieth century and was narrated by the inventor Phineas Flagg - an imaginary turn-of-the-century explorer/scientist/raconteur (modeled after Phileas Fogg, Jules Verne's literary world traveler character in the novel Around The World in Eighty Days). The film used the ArriVision over/under 3D film system. The film was only showing at Six Flags Power Plant theme park.

See also
Sensorama, one of the earliest known prototype of an immersive, multi-sensory technology

References

Amusement rides introduced in 1984
1984 films
1984 3D films
1984 short films
3D short films
American short films
4D films